Energy is an unincorporated community in Scotland County, in the U.S. state of Missouri.

History
A post office called Energy was established in 1893, and remained in operation until 1904. Besides the post office, Energy had a country store.

References

Unincorporated communities in Scotland County, Missouri
Unincorporated communities in Missouri